Juan Antonio López-Cózar Jáimez (born 20 August 1994) is a Spanish former cyclist, who competed as a professional from 2018 to 2022.

Major results

2018
 6th Prueba Villafranca-Ordiziako Klasika
 9th Overall Grande Prémio de Portugal N2
2019
 3rd Prueba Villafranca de Ordizia

References

External links

1994 births
Living people
Spanish male cyclists
Cyclists from Andalusia
Sportspeople from Granada